Cricket Girls & Beer is a 2011 Indian Telugu-language coming-of-age film directed by Umesh Kumar and starring newcomers Aadarsh Balakrishna, Surya Tej, Naga Shaurya, and Sindhu Affan.

Cast 
Aadarsh Balakrishna as Vijay
Surya Tej as Vivek
Naga Shaurya as Vikram
Sindhu Affan as Swapna
M. S. Narayana
Surya
Rajitha
Vinod Kumar
Siva Reddy
Raja Sridhar

Production 
This is the second venture of Umesh Kumar, who previously directed Circus Circus (2009). The film is set in a college campus and features several new faces including cricketer Aadarsh Balakrishna and Surya Tej, who played a supporting role in Vinayakudu.

Soundtrack 
Music by Das and Shyam Vai.

Release and reception 
The film was scheduled to release on 27 September, but was postponed to 30 September.
Y. Sunitha Chowdhury of The Hindu opined that "He [Adarsh Balakrishna] and Surya Tej are resolutely superficial, Naga Shourya should try and be an original instead of imitating Prabhas and Mahesh Babu". A critic from Full Hyderabad opined that "In sum, this is a film that will not have takers even among TV channels".

References 

2011 films
2010s Telugu-language films
2011 drama films
Indian coming-of-age drama films